Matsumoto House is a historic home located at Raleigh, Wake County, North Carolina.  It was built in 1952–1954, and is a one-story, rectangular, post and beam-framed house cantilevered over a concrete block base, Miesian inspired dwelling. It was designed by George Matsumoto and built by Frank Walser. It has a paved and landscaped forecourt and full-width, glazed rear wall fronted by a cantilevered, screened porch.

It was listed on the National Register of Historic Places in 1994.

References

Houses on the National Register of Historic Places in North Carolina
Modernist architecture in North Carolina
Houses completed in 1954
Houses in Raleigh, North Carolina
National Register of Historic Places in Raleigh, North Carolina